The narrow-lined pufferfish  (Arothron manilensis) is a demersal marine fish belonging to the family Tetraodontidae.

Description

Arothron manilensis is a small sized fish which grows up to 31 cm length. Its body is oval shape, spherical et relatively elongated. The skin is not covered with scales. The fish has no pelvic fin and no lateral line. The dorsal fin and the anal fin are small, symmetric and located at the end of the body. Its snout is short with two pairs of nostrils and its mouth is terminal with four strong teeth.

The background coloration is whitish to grey with brown horizontal lines, all the fins are yellowish and semi-translucide except the caudal fin which is opaque and outlined with black. Black blotch more or less circular at the base of the pectoral fin.
The iris is also yellowish

Distribution and habitat
This species is found in tropical waters of the central Indo-Pacific. It lives in estuaries, on the sheltered top reef or lagoons from the surface to 20 m depth. It is common in seagrass beds and sandy areas. Juveniles grow among mangroves.

Feeding
Arothron manilensis feeds on benthic invertebrates.

Behaviour
This pufferfish  has a diurn activity, it is also a solitary animal.

In the aquarium
Salinity:	Saltwater
pH:	7.6-8.2
Temperature:	74-80 °F (23-26 °C)	
Maximum Size:	12 inches (31 cm)
Minimum Tank:	100 Gallons (US) 
Activity:	Hunter/seeker
Lifespan:	10 years	
Breeding:	Unknown
Gender:	No sexual dimorphism	

These puffers are also sensitive to nitrites and ammonia and should only be introduced into a fully cycled aquarium. High quality water is needed for these puffers to thrive, a sump or refugium is a good idea on a tank for this puffer.  Diet -  They feed on live and frozen foods, snails, freeze dried krill, frozen shrimp, bloodworms - live or frozen, crab legs, shell-on shrimp, crabs.

The narrow lined puffer is a beautiful saltwater puffer. They will do well in a tank with live rock and enjoy searching the rock for living things to snack on. They are mild toward other fish, but are not reef safe as they will readily snack on many invertebrates found in a reef. They do tend to be more territorial and will not accept conspecifics.

References

Lieske & Myers,Coral reef fishes,Princeton University Press, 2009,

External links
 

Arothron
Articles containing video clips
Fish described in 1822